In classical mechanics, the two-body problem is to predict the motion of two massive objects which are abstractly viewed as point particles. The problem assumes that the two objects interact only with one another; the only force affecting each object arises from the other one, and all other objects are ignored.

The most prominent case of the classical two-body problem is the gravitational case (see also Kepler problem), arising in astronomy for predicting the orbits (or escapes from orbit) of objects such as satellites, planets, and stars. A two-point-particle model of such a system nearly always describes its behavior well enough to provide useful insights and predictions.

A simpler "one body" model, the "central-force problem", treats one object as the immobile source of a force acting on the other. One then seeks to predict the motion of the single remaining mobile object. Such an approximation can give useful results when one object is much more massive than the other (as with a light planet orbiting a heavy star, where the star can be treated as essentially stationary).

However, the one-body approximation is usually unnecessary except as a stepping stone. For many forces, including gravitational ones, the general version of the two-body problem can be reduced to a pair of one-body problems, allowing it to be solved completely, and giving a solution simple enough to be used effectively.

By contrast, the three-body problem (and, more generally, the n-body problem for n ≥ 3) cannot be solved in terms of first integrals, except in special cases.

Results for prominent cases

Gravitation and other inverse-square examples 

The two-body problem is interesting in astronomy because pairs of astronomical objects are often moving rapidly in arbitrary directions (so their motions become interesting), widely separated from one another (so they will not collide) and even more widely separated from other objects (so outside influences will be small enough to be ignored safely).

Under the force of gravity, each member of a pair of such objects will orbit their mutual center of mass in an elliptical pattern, unless they are moving fast enough to escape one another entirely, in which case their paths will diverge along other planar conic sections. If one object is very much heavier than the other, it will move far less than the other with reference to the shared center of mass. The mutual center of mass may even be inside the larger object.

For the derivation of the solutions to the problem, see Classical central-force problem or Kepler problem.

In principle, the same solutions apply to macroscopic problems involving objects interacting not only through gravity, but through any other attractive scalar force field obeying an inverse-square law, with electrostatic attraction being the obvious physical example. In practice, such problems rarely arise. Except perhaps in experimental apparatus or other specialized equipment, we rarely encounter electrostatically interacting objects which are moving fast enough, and in such a direction, as to avoid colliding, and/or which are isolated enough from their surroundings.

The dynamical system of a two-body system under the influence of torque turns out to be a Sturm-Liouville equation.

Inapplicability to atoms and subatomic particles 

Although the two-body model treats the objects as point particles, classical mechanics only apply to systems of macroscopic scale. Most behavior of subatomic particles cannot be predicted under the classical assumptions underlying this article or using the mathematics here.

Electrons in an atom are sometimes described as "orbiting" its nucleus, following an early conjecture of Niels Bohr (this is the source of the term "orbital"). However, electrons don't actually orbit nuclei in any meaningful sense, and quantum mechanics are necessary for any useful understanding of the electron's real behavior. Solving the classical two-body problem for an electron orbiting an atomic nucleus is misleading and does not produce many useful insights.

Reduction to two independent, one-body problems 

The complete two-body problem can be solved by re-formulating it as two one-body problems: a trivial one and one that involves solving for the motion of one particle in an external potential. Since many one-body problems can be solved exactly, the corresponding two-body problem can also be solved.

Let  and  be the vector positions of the two bodies, and m1 and m2 be their masses.

When applied to the two masses, Newton's second law states that

where F12 is the force on mass 1 due to its interactions with mass 2, and F21 is the force on mass 2 due to its interactions with mass 1. The two dots on top of the x position vectors denote their second derivative with respect to time, or their acceleration vectors.

Adding and subtracting these two equations decouples them into two one-body problems, which can be solved independently. Adding equations (1) and  results in an equation describing the center of mass (barycenter) motion. By contrast, subtracting equation (2) from equation (1) results in an equation that describes how the vector  between the masses changes with time.

Center of mass motion (1st one-body problem) 

Let  be the position of the center of mass (barycenter) of the system. Addition of the force equations (1) and (2) yields

where we have used Newton's third law  and where

The resulting equation:

shows that the velocity  of the center of mass is constant, from which follows that the total momentum  is also constant (conservation of momentum). Hence, the position  of the center of mass can be determined at all times from the initial positions and velocities.

Displacement vector motion (2nd one-body problem)
Dividing both force equations by the respective masses, subtracting the second equation from the first, and rearranging gives the equation

where we have again used Newton's third law  and where  is the displacement vector from mass 2 to mass 1, as defined above.

The subtracted equation can therefore be written:

where  is the reduced mass

For the case where  follows an inverse-square law, see the Kepler problem.

Once  and  have been determined, the original trajectories may be obtained

as may be verified by substituting the definitions of R  and r into the right-hand sides of these two equations.

Two-body motion is planar 

The motion of two bodies with respect to each other always lies in a plane (in the center of mass frame).

Proof: Defining the linear momentum  and the angular momentum  of the system, with respect to the center of mass, by the equations

and using the property of the vector cross product that  for any vectors  and  pointing in the same direction,

Introducing the assumption (true of most physical forces, as they obey Newton's strong third law of motion) that the force between two particles acts along the line between their positions, it follows that  and the angular momentum vector  is constant (conserved). Therefore, the displacement vector  and its velocity  are always in the plane perpendicular to the constant vector .

Energy of the two-body system 

If the force  is conservative then the system has a potential energy , so the total energy can be written as

In the center of mass frame the kinetic energy is the lowest and the total energy becomes

The coordinates  and  can be expressed as

 
and in a similar way the energy E is related to the energies  and  that separately contain the kinetic energy of each body:

Central forces 

For many physical problems, the force  is a central force, i.e., it is of the form

We now have:

where F(r) is negative in the case of an attractive force.

See also
 Energy drift
 Equation of the center
 Euler's three-body problem
 Kepler orbit
 Kepler problem
 n-body problem
 Virial theorem

References

Bibliography

External links 

 Two-body problem at Eric Weisstein's World of Physics

Orbits
Dynamical systems